is a Japanese long-distance runner, whose main event is the marathon. She won the 2007 edition of the Nagoya Marathon, clocking 2:28:49. Her personal best (2:25:21) was set in 2005. Other wins in her career include the Berlin Marathon in 2003 and consecutive wins at the Kagawa Marugame Half Marathon in 2003 and 2004. She was born in Motomiya.

She represented her country in the marathon at the 2007 World Championships in Athletics.

Achievements
All results regarding marathon, unless stated otherwise

References
 

1975 births
Living people
Sportspeople from Fukushima Prefecture
Japanese female long-distance runners
Japanese female marathon runners
Berlin Marathon female winners
Japan Championships in Athletics winners
World Athletics Championships athletes for Japan